The 2001 Island Games were the ninth Island Games, and were held in Isle of Man, from July 7 to July 13, 2001.

Medal table

Sports
The sports chosen for the games were:

External links
 Man 2001
 Island Games 2001

 
Island Games, 2001
Island Games
Sport in the Isle of Man
Island Games
Multi-sport events in the Isle of Man
International sports competitions hosted by the Isle of Man
July 2001 sports events in Europe